Marcus Ward may refer to:

Marcus Ward & Co., British publishing company
Marcus Lawrence Ward (1812–1884), American politician